Maretia is a genus of heart urchins belonging to the family Spatangidae.

Species
 Maretia carinata Bolau, 1873 
 Maretia cordata Mortensen, 1948 
 Maretia estenozi Sánchez Roig, 1926
 Maretia planulata (Lamarck, 1816)

Description
These sea urchins are irregular, as the mouth is located at the front of the underside of the animal, while the anus is located in rear end position.

Fossil record
Fossils of Maretia are found in marine strata from the Eocene until the Quaternary (age range: from 40.4 to 0.012 million years ago.).  Fossils are known from some localities in United Kingdom, United States, Germany, Cuba, Indonesia, New Zealand,  and Eritrea and Greece.

References

 Rowe, F.W.E & Gates, J. (1995). Echinodermata. In ‘Zoological Catalogue of Australia’. 33 (Ed A. Wells.) pp xiii + 510 (CSIRO Australia, Melbourne.)

External links
 Reef Guide
 Flickr
 Underwater Photographs by P. Rossi

Spatangoida
maretia
Taxa named by John Edward Gray